Mizan (scale) is a comprehensive treatise on the contents of Islam, written by Javed Ahmad Ghamidi, a Pakistani Islamic scholar and philosopher. It is published in Urdu by Al-Mawrid Institute of Islamic Sciences. The book is also available in the form of different booklets. The book has also been published in English language in Renaissance Islamic Journal.
Javed Ahmed Ghamidi wrote a summary of this book in the form of a small book named "Al-Islam". Dr. Saleem Shehzad translated "Mizan" and "Al-Islam" into English as "Islam: A Comprehensive Introduction" and "Islam: A Concise Introduction" respectively.

Contents
<small>Published by: Dar-ul-Ishraq
Sources of Islam 
Principles of understanding the Qur'an
Principles of determining the Sunnah
Principles of understanding the Hadith

Wisdom
Framework of Islam 
Beliefs
The Basic Premise of Religion 
The Essence of Faith 
Belief in God: His Being 
Attributes of God 
The Dealings and Practices of God 
Belief in the Angels 
Belief in the Prophets 
Some Traits of the Prophets 
Some Issues pertaining to Prophethood 
Belief in Divine Books 
Belief in the Hearafter 
The Signs and Events of the Day of Judgement 
The Phases and Abodes of the Day of Judgement 
Morals and morality 

The Book
The political law of Islam 
The economic law of Islam 
The Islamic Shariah of preaching 
The Islamic law of Jihad
The penal law of Islam  
The dietary laws 
Customs and behavioral laws 
Oath and their atonement
The Islamic law of worship rituals
The Prayer
Importance, history, objectives, pre-requisites, rituals, and utterances of prayer 
Prayer timings, raka'ah, concession, congregation, mosques, rectifying mistakes, etiquette, and various types of prayer 
The Islamic Shariah of Zakah
The fast
The rituals of Hajj and Umrah
The ritual of animal sacrifice
The social law of Islam
Basic principle 
Matrimony, marriage rites and prerequisites 
Relations prohibited for marriage 
Pre-requisites of Nikah (Marriage)
Rights and obligations of the spouses 
Polygamy 
Etiquette of sexual intimacy 
Eila and Zihar(ايلا و ظهار)
Divorce
Directives relating to widows 
Norms of gender interaction 
Rights of parents 
Rights of orphans 
Slavery

See also
List of Sunni books
Tadabbur-i-Qur'an

References

External links
 Complete Mizan (in Urdu)
 Complete Mizan (in English)
 Complete Al-Islam (condensed version of Mizan): Urdu, English
 Introduction to 'Meezan' at International Book Fair by Javed Ahmad Ghamidi
 Articles available on the internet written by Javed Ahmed Ghamidi.
 Books to download, written by Javed Ahmed Ghamidi. 
 Books available at WorldCat, written by Javed Ahmed Ghamidi.
 The Law of Evidence by Javed Ghamidi

Islamic literature
Sharia
Treatises